Wasing is an agricultural and woodland village, country estate and civil parish in West Berkshire, England owned almost wholly by the descendants of the Mount family. In local administration, its few inhabitants convene their own civil parish, but share many facilities with Brimpton which was in its civil parish at the time of the 2011 Census.

Geography

Its nearest village with general amenities is Aldermaston and its nearest town is Tadley. Wasing Wood Ponds is a site of Special Scientific Interest (SSSI).

Wasing Place
Wasing Place, Wasing Park, and the Wasing Estate, including woodland, are largely owned and managed by Joshua Dugdale, who inherited them from his mother, Lady Cecilia Dugdale. Its estate is centred on a manor house which was purchased in 1759 by the London nautical publisher, John Mount. He built Wasing Place, completed in 1770, which became the home of his descendants, including MPs, William Mount, William George Mount and Sir William Mount. The house was partially rebuilt in 1954 after a fire in 1945.

The Georgian house has a 180° panorama. Wasing Park, to the north of the house, is Grade II listed. The adjacent church of St Nicholas, remaining almost a private chapel due to its isolation, is Grade I listed, with parts of the building dating to the 13th century.

References

External links 

Wasing Estate

 
Villages in Berkshire
Civil parishes in Berkshire
West Berkshire District